This is a discography of Spandau Ballet, an English band formed in London in the late 1970s. Initially inspired by the New Romantic fashion, their music has featured a mixture of funk, jazz, soul and synth-pop.

They were one of the most successful bands of the 1980s, achieving international top ten singles and albums across the world.

The band split acrimoniously in 1990 but announced their reunion in March 2009, complete with a tour that began in October 2009.

Albums

Studio albums

Compilation albums

Live albums

Singles

References

Discographies of British artists
Spandau Ballet
New wave discographies